Alexander Joseph Epstein is an American author and commentator who advocates for the expansion of fossil fuels. He is the founder and president of the Center for Industrial Progress, a for-profit organization in San Diego, California. He is the author of The Moral Case for Fossil Fuels (2014) and Fossil Future (2022), in which he argues for the expanded use of fossil fuels like coal, oil, and natural gas.

Epstein is a former adjunct scholar at Cato Institute, a libertarian think tank, and a former fellow at the Ayn Rand Institute. He rejects the overwhelming scientific consensus on climate change, which is that climate change is dangerous, progressing, and human caused, although he objects to being labeled as a climate change denier.

Early life and education
Epstein grew up in Chevy Chase, Maryland, and attended Montgomery County Public Schools, where his favorite subjects were mathematics and science. He has said he was influenced by Ayn Rand, especially her novel Atlas Shrugged, and also Thomas Sowell. He is Jewish but not religious.

He attended Duke University, where for two years he was editor and publisher of The Duke Review. He studied philosophy and computer science, graduating with a Bachelor of Arts.

Career

Ayn Rand Institute
From 2004 to 2011, Epstein was a writer and fellow at the Ayn Rand Institute, a non-profit organization in Irvine, California, that promotes Ayn Rand's novels and Objectivism.

Center for Industrial Progress

In 2011, Epstein founded the Center for Industrial Progress (CIP), which he calls a "for-profit think tank".

In 2012, Epstein debated American environmentalist Bill McKibben while representing CIP at an event held at Duke University.

In 2013, Rolling Stone placed Epstein and the Center for Industrial Progress on its list of top global warming deniers. Epstein wrote a rebuttal in Forbes that criticized the term global warming denier, which he said was a smear tactic intended to liken critics of environmentalism to Holocaust deniers.

In 2014, Epstein and CIP publicly supported the Keystone Pipeline. He wrote The Moral Case for Fossil Fuels, which reached #17 on a list of bestselling science books in early December 2014. In the book he calls the idea that the majority of climate scientists agree that humans are causing climate change a "fabrication." A Foreign Policy review of the book found that it "doesn't engage with much of the relevant scientific context" and "paints a paranoid picture of a climate science that cannot be trusted."

In 2015, The Guardian published an opinion piece by Jason Wilson critical of Epstein and CIP, stating, "Epstein's work has been popular and influential on the right because it is a particularly fluent, elaborate form of climate denialism. The CIP prides itself on being able to train corporate leaders to 'successfully outmessage "environmentalists"'."

In 2016, Epstein testified before the Senate Environment and Public Works Committee at the invitation of the committee's chairman, James Inhofe (R-Okla.), who has called climate change a "hoax." Epstein suggested that rising carbon dioxide levels "benefit plants and Americans." When questioned by committee member Barbara Boxer (D-Calif.) as to why Epstein, whose academic training is in philosophy, was even there, Epstein responded, "to teach you how to think clearly." Boxer replied "... you are a philosopher, not a scientist, and I don’t appreciate getting lectured by a philosopher about science."

Epstein opposed shutdowns in the early months of the COVID-19 pandemic in 2020, and compared the virus to the seasonal flu. Asked by The Guardian at the time about coal interests being among CIP's clients, Epstein said he advised them about messaging but that they did not influence his statements.

Epstein has contributed opinion pieces to several media outlets on climate and energy issues, including USA Today, The Wall Street Journal, The Washington Times, The Orange County Register, Fox News, and Forbes magazine.

Views
Epstein, who has argued that fossil fuels are good for developing countries, wrote in 1999 in the Duke Review, a conservative college newspaper, that African countries are inferior to the West. The 1999 article was found by Documented, an investigative group, and reported by the Washington Post in April 2022. In a video response, Epstein denied racial biases but said, "Western culture is overall superior and certainly in terms of government historically, because it’s really the birth of modern freedom," and called for the Washington Post writer, Maxine Joselow, to be fired.

Published works

References

External links
 
 Center for Industrial Progress
 Fossil Future

1980 births
21st-century American non-fiction writers
American atheists
American humanists
Detroit Free Press people
Duke University alumni
Houston Chronicle people
Jewish American atheists
Living people
Objectivism scholars
Objectivists
People from Chevy Chase, Maryland
Writers from California
San Francisco Chronicle people
Institute directors
American non-fiction environmental writers
Fossil fuels
The Atlanta Journal-Constitution people
The Philadelphia Inquirer people
Activists from Maryland
Activists from California
21st-century American Jews